Barbour's clawed gecko (Pseudogonatodes barbouri) is a species of lizard in the family Sphaerodactylidae. The species is endemic to Peru.

Etymology
The specific name, barbouri, is in honor of American herpetologist Thomas Barbour.

Geographic range
P. barbouri is found in northwestern Peru.

Habitat
The preferred natural habitat of P. barbouri is forest.

Reproduction
P. barbouri is oviparous.

References

Further reading
Bauer AM, Beach-Mehrotra M, Bermudez Y, Clark GE, Daza JD, Glynne E, Hagyari D, Harnden JM, Holovacs N, Kanasiro A, Lofthus AJ, Pierce ZW, Aaliya R, Syed S, Vallejo-Pareja MC, Walker BA, Willett J (2018). "The Tiny Skull of the Peruvian Gecko Pseudogonatodes barbouri (Gekkota: Sphaerodactylidae) Obtained via a Divide-And-Conquer Approach to Morphological Data Acquisition". South American Journal of Herpetology 13 (2): 102–116. 
Koch C, Venegas PJ, Santa Cruz R, Böhme W (2018). "Annotated checklist and key to the species of amphibians and reptiles inhabiting the northern Peruvian dry forest along the Andean valley of the Marañón River and its tributaries". Zootaxa 4385 (1): 1–101. 
Noble GK (1921). "Some New Lizards from Northwestern Peru". Annals of the New York Academy of Sciences 29: 133–139. (Lepidoblepharis barbouri, new species, p. 133).
Parker HW (1926). "The Neotropical Lizards of the Genera Lepidoblepharis, Pseudogonatodes, Lathrogecko, and Sphærodactylus, with the Description of a new Genus". Annals and Magazine of Natural History, Ninth Series 17: 291–301. (Pseudogonatodes barbouri, new combination, p. 298).
Rösler H (2000). "Kommentierte Liste der rezent, subrezent und fossil bekannten Geckotaxa (Reptilia: Gekkonomorpha)". Gekkota 2: 28–153. (Pseudogonatodes barbouri, p. 106). (in German).

Pseudogonatodes
Reptiles of Peru
Endemic fauna of Peru
Taxa named by Gladwyn Kingsley Noble
Reptiles described in 1921